Hello Waveforms is the ninth album by British electronic musician and record producer, William Orbit. It was released in the UK on 20 February 2006. It is a mostly instrumental ambient record, with only four tracks containing vocals: "Spiral", featuring Kenna and the Sugababes, "They Live In The Sky", sung by Annette and Paulette Morris, and "Bubble Universe", which is based on a song previously recorded with Madonna called "Liquid Love", and has vocals by Laurie Mayer. Mayer also collaborates and co-writes other tracks of the record. All tracks are written by Orbit, either alone or in collaboration with Laurie Mayer and Rico Conning. The second track, "Humming Chorus", is from the opera "Madame Butterfly". In the United States, the album reached number ten on the Billboard Top Electronic Albums chart.

Track listing
 "Sea Green" (William Orbit)  – 6:22
 "Humming Chorus" (Giacomo Puccini; arranged by William Orbit)  – 3:38
 "Surfin'" (William Orbit, Laurie Mayer, Rico Conning) – 4:43
 "You Know Too Much About Flying Saucers" (William Orbit, Laurie Mayer, Rico Conning)  – 5:00
 "Spiral" (feat. Sugababes & Kenna) (William Orbit, Sugababes, Kenna, Karen Poole)  – 4:47
 "Who Owns The Octopus"  – 5:00
 "Bubble Universe" (William Orbit, Laurie Mayer, Rico Conning)  – 4:02
 "Fragamosia"  – 6:32
 "Firebrand" (William Orbit, Laurie Mayer, Rico Conning)  – 6:16
 "They Live In The Sky" (William Orbit, Annette Morris, Paulette Morris) – 4:56
 "Colours From Nowhere"  – 5:41

Bonus track
G155 is a track from the "Hello Waveforms" recording sessions that was not included on the album. It can be heard on William Orbit's official website and was issued as a promo single on 7" vinyl only.

References

External links
WilliamOrbit.com — official website.

2006 albums
William Orbit albums
Albums produced by William Orbit
Sanctuary Records albums